Lewis County is a county located in the U.S. state of Tennessee. As of the 2020 census, the population was 12,582. Its county seat is Hohenwald. The county is named for explorer Meriwether Lewis, who died and was buried at Grinder's Stand near Hohenwald in 1809.

History

Lewis County was formed in 1843 from parts of Perry, Hickman, Lawrence, Maury and Wayne counties. It was named for explorer Meriwether Lewis of the Lewis and Clark Expedition. Lewis's grave is located at the geographic center of the county. The bill for its creation was proposed by Powhatan Gordon in the Tennessee State Senate.

On October 7, 2009, a ceremony was held at the cemetery to commemorate the bicentennial of Lewis's death. A bust of Lewis was presented to the National Park Service, which manages the site.

Lewis County was the site of the Cane Creek Massacre.

Geography

Adjacent counties
Hickman County (north)
Maury County (east)
Lawrence County (south)
Wayne County (southwest)
Perry County (west)

National protected area
 Natchez Trace Parkway (part)

State protected areas
 Auntney Hollow State Natural Area
 Devil's Backbone State Natural Area
 Dry Branch State Natural Area
 Hick Hill Wildlife Management Area
 Langford Branch State Natural Area
 Laurel Hill Wildlife Management Area
 Lewis State Forest

Major highways

Demographics

2020 census

As of the 2020 United States census, there were 12,582 people, 4,715 households, and 3,175 families residing in the county.

2000 census
As of the census of 2000, there were 11,367 people, 4,381 households, and 3,215 families residing in the county.  The population density was 40 people per square mile (16/km2).  There were 4,821 housing units at an average density of 17 per square mile (7/km2).  The racial makeup of the county was 97.07% White, 1.45% Black or African American, 0.20% Native American, 0.18% Asian, 0.29% from other races, and 0.80% from two or more races.  1.20% of the population were Hispanic or Latino of any race.

There were 4,381 households, out of which 33.20% had children under the age of 18 living with them, 58.90% were married couples living together, 10.70% had a female householder with no husband present, and 26.60% were non-families. 23.50% of all households were made up of individuals, and 10.60% had someone living alone who was 65 years of age or older.  The average household size was 2.54 and the average family size was 2.98.

In the county, the population was spread out, with 25.80% under the age of 18, 8.30% from 18 to 24, 27.40% from 25 to 44, 24.80% from 45 to 64, and 13.60% who were 65 years of age or older.  The median age was 37 years. For every 100 females there were 96.90 males.  For every 100 females age 18 and over, there were 91.80 males.

The median income for a household in the county was $30,444, and the median income for a family was $35,972. Males had a median income of $27,060 versus $19,847 for females. The per capita income for the county was $14,664.  About 10.30% of families and 13.40% of the population were below the poverty line, including 16.60% of those under age 18 and 12.20% of those age 65 or over.

Communities

City
Hohenwald (county seat)

Census-designated place
Summertown (Mostly in Lawrence County)

Unincorporated communities

Buffalo Valley
Gordonsburg
Kimmins

Politics

Historically, like all of secessionist Middle Tennessee, Lewis County was overwhelmingly Democratic. Although it did vote for Charles Evans Hughes in 1916 and Warren G. Harding in 1920, Lewis County would be firmly Democratic for the next six decades, being one of only two Tennessee counties to remain loyal to both Hubert Humphrey in 1968 and George McGovern in 1972. Ronald Reagan broke this Democratic sequence with a 177-vote majority over Walter Mondale in his 1984 landslide, but Lewis County would subsequently remain Democratic up to 2000. Since then, however, like much of the rural white South, it has become overwhelmingly Republican due to opposition to the Democratic Party's liberal views on social issues.

Education
The county is served by Lewis County High School.

See also
 National Register of Historic Places listings in Lewis County, Tennessee

References

External links

 Official site
 Lewis County, TNGenWeb - free genealogy resources for the county

 
1843 establishments in Tennessee
Populated places established in 1843
Counties of Appalachia
Middle Tennessee